Haciendas de Jalisco y Aledaños (1506–1821) is a book written in Spanish by Ricardo Lancaster-Jones y Verea (1905–83), it's about the rural history of haciendas (rural estates) in the State of Jalisco (Mexico), since the origins of the Kingdom of Nueva Galicia (New Galicia) in the earliest 16th Century, to the earliest days of the Independence of Mexico in 1821. It's the first publication in its kind in Western Mexico and the most complete book about rural properties of the State of Jalisco and their development through time.

A summary of this book is mentioned in the "Boletín" of the Real Academia Española (1975); it also appears in the bibliography of many contemporary authors like Rodolfo Fernández (2003), Jean Meyer (1990), Ramón María Serrera (1977), Eric Van Young (1983),  etc.

History 
The book's author was requested by Financiera Aceptaciones S.A. (a finance company from Mexico's Banco Serfin), to publish this work for the Mexican public due to the interest of the Mexican Academic circles, it was inspired by his own thesis "Haciendas de Jalisco y aledaños: fincas rústicas de antaño, 1506–1821", a 270 pages work that was made to obtain a Master of Arts degree in Latin American Studies at the University of New Mexico in 1973.

This book was published in August 1974 by Financiera Aceptaciones S.A. at "Vera" press, in Guadalajara, Jalisco (Mexico), with a circulation of 2000 copies.

Table of Contents 
 Prefacio
 Capítulo I.	Como encontraron la tierra los Conquistadores.
 Capítulo II.	Algunas Mercedes del Siglo XVI.
 Capítulo III.	Reestructuraciones del Siglo XVII.
 Capítulo IV.	Más cambios en el Siglo XVIII.
 Capítulo V.	Mayorazgos de Nueva Galicia y Provincia de Avalos.
 Capítulo VI.	Las Propiedades Rústicas de la Iglesia en Nueva Galicia y Provincia de Avalos, después Intendencia de Guadalajara.
 Conclusiones
 Bibliografía
 Lista de Ilustraciones
1 Arco Triunfal de la Venta del Astillero.
2 Merced a Pedro Plascencia, 1593.
3 Documento del Mayorazgo de Porres Baranda, S. XVII.
4 Ordenanzas Reales, Manuscrito, 1768, portada.
5 Continuación del anterior, página interior.
6 Licencia para marcar ganado, 1779, primera página.
7 Continuación del anterior, página interior.
8 Retrato de Don Pedro Sánchez de Tagle, dueño de Cuisillos y Santa Ana Apacueco.
9 Hacienda de Toluquilla, acueducto S. XVIII.
10 Parroquia de Ciénega de Mata, S. XVIII.
11 Portada de la Casa de Ciénega de Mata, S. XVIII.
12 Patio interior de la Casa de Ciénega de Mata, S. XVIII.
13 Ruinas de la Casa de la Hacienda del Cabezón.
14 Fuente de la Casa de la Hacienda del Cabezón, ya desaparecida.
15 Casa de la Hacienda de Portillo, frente al Río Santiago.
16 Mapa de Nueva España, 1579.
17 Plano de la Hacienda de Santa Ana Apacueco, 1756.
18 Plano de Tepic y sus alrededores, S. XVIII.
19 Croquis de la Hacienda de Toluquilla, S. XVI.
20 Plano de la Hacienda de Mazatepec, S. XIX.

Book cataloguing data 
This book is catalogued in many public libraries thorough Mexico and abroad, among them:

Library of Congress 
 This book is catalogued at the Library of Congress  as follows:
 LC Control No.: 76469878
 LCCN Permalink: Haciendas de Jalisco y aledaños, 1506–1821
 Type of Material: Book (Print, Microform, Electronic, etc.)
 Personal Name: Lancaster-Jones, Ricardo.
 Main Title: Haciendas de Jalisco y aledaños (1506–1821) / Ricardo Lancaster-Jones.
 Published/Created: Guadalajara, México. : Financiera Aceptaciones, 1974.
 Description: 95 p., [19] leaves of plates : ill. ; 24 cm.
 Notes: Bibliography: p. 89-95.
 Subjects: Haciendas --Mexico --History.
 LC Classification: HD1471.M6 L36

Biblioteca Nacional de México 
 This book is catalogued at the Biblioteca Nacional de México  as follows:
 No. sis.: 000161259
 Colección: General (BN)
 Clasificación: G 630.97232 LAN.h.
 Autor principal: Lancaster-Jones, Ricardo
 Título: Haciendas de Jalisco y aledaños (1506–1821)
 Lugar: Guadalajara, Jal., México
 Editorial: Financiera Aceptaciones S.A. [Vera]
 Año: 1974
 Descripción: 95 p. : il. ; 24 cm.
 Bibliografía: Incluye bibliografías
 Tema: Haciendas, México, Historia

Biblioteca Nacional de España 
 This book is catalogued at the Biblioteca Nacional de España  as follows:
 CDU: 333.5(72)"15/18"
 CDU: 972"15/18"
 Autor personal: Lancaster-Jones, Ricardo
 Título: Haciendas de Jalisco y aledaños (1506–1821) [Texto impreso]
 Publicación: México : [Financiera Aceptaciones], 1974
 Descripción física: 95 p., 2 h. : lám. y map. ; 24 cm
 Encabez. materia:	Propiedad rústica -- México -- S.XVI-XVIII
 Encabez. materia:	Propiedad rústica -- México -- S.XIX
 Encabez. materia:	Haciendas -- México -- Historia

External links 
 Haciendas de Jalisco y aledaños (1506–1821) | Open Library

Notes 

1974 non-fiction books
Historiography of Mexico
History of Mexico
Colonial Mexico
History of agriculture in Mexico